18th World Sports Acrobatics Championships were held in Riesa, Germany from September 27 to September 29, 2002, at the Erdgas Arena.

Results

Men's Group

Men's Pair

Mixed Pair

Women's Group

Women's Pair

Medal table

References
FIG official site

Acrobatic Gymnastics Championships
Acrobatic Gymnastics World Championships
International gymnastics competitions hosted by Germany
2002 in German sport